Brucerolis is a genus of isopods in the family Serolidae, found in the Southern Ocean.

The genus was first described in 2009 by Gary Poore and Melissa Storey, and the genus name honours Niel L. Bruce.

Species
There are ten recognized species:

Brucerolis brandtae Storey & Poore, 2009
Brucerolis bromleyana (Suhm, 1876)
Brucerolis cidaris (Poore & Brandt, 1997)
Brucerolis howensis Storey & Poore, 2009
Brucerolis hurleyi Storey & Poore, 2009
Brucerolis macdonnellae (Menzies, 1962)
Brucerolis maryannae (Menzies, 1962)
Brucerolis nowra Poore & Storey, 2009
Brucerolis osheai Storey & Poore, 2009
Brucerolis victoriensis Storey & Poore, 2009

External links

Sphaeromatidea